Mount Famine is a gritstone hill between the villages of Hayfield and Chinley in the Derbyshire Peak District. The hill's name originates from the period of the Enclosure Acts (from the late eighteenth century) when tenant farmers struggled to make a living from poor farming land.

It was identified by J Barnatt in 2014.

The hilltop area was acquired by the National Trust in 2006 and is designated as access land for the public.

The Pennine Bridleway runs along the south and west sides of Mount Famine. Since 2005, there has been an annual fell race each May from Hayfield around Mount Famine and South Head.

Mount Famine is one of the 95 Ethels hills of the Peak District, launched by the countryside charity CPRE in 2021.

References 

Mountains and hills of the Peak District
Mountains and hills of Derbyshire